The subfamily Tylomyinae consists of several species of New World rats and mice including the vesper and climbing rats.  They are not as well known as their relatives in the subfamilies Sigmodontinae and Neotominae.  Many authorities place all three of these subfamilies in a single subfamily, Sigmodontinae.

List of Species 

SUBFAMILY TYLOMYINAE
Tribe Nyctomyini
Genus Otonyctomys
Hatt's vesper rat, Otonyctomys hatti
Genus Nyctomys
Sumichrast's vesper rat, Nyctomys sumichrasti
Tribe Tylomyini
Genus Tylomys
Chiapan climbing rat, Tylomys bullaris
Fulvous-bellied climbing rat, Tylomys fulviventer
Mira climbing rat, Tylomys mirae
Peters's climbing rat, Tylomys nudicaudus
Panamanian climbing rat, Tylomys panamensis
Tumbala climbing rat, Tylomys tumbalensis
Watson's climbing rat, Tylomys watsoni
Genus Ototylomys
Big-eared climbing rat, Ototylomys phyllotis
La Pera big-eared climbing rat, Ototylomys chiapensis

See also 
New World rats and mice

References 

Steppan, S. J., R. A. Adkins, and J. Anderson. 2004. Phylogeny and divergence date estimates of rapid radiations in muroid rodents based on multiple nuclear genes. Systematic Biology, 53:533-553.

 
Cricetidae
Mammal subfamilies
Taxa named by Osvaldo Reig